Christine Francke  (born 12 June 1974) is a German retired football goalkeeper. She was part of the Germany women's national football team at the 1996 Summer Olympics, but did not compete.

See also
 Germany at the 1996 Summer Olympics

References

External links
 
 

1974 births
Living people
German women's footballers
Place of birth missing (living people)
Footballers at the 1996 Summer Olympics
Women's association football goalkeepers
Germany women's international footballers
Olympic footballers of Germany
1995 FIFA Women's World Cup players